Pete Townshend Live BAM 1993 is a live recording by Pete Townshend.  The music was recorded at the Brooklyn Academy of Music, Brooklyn, N.Y., on 7 August 1993 and a double CD released 11 August 2003 by UK company Eel Pie Recording Productions Ltd.  The concert took place during Townshend's Psychoderelict tour and the CD features the entire Psychoderlict performance as well as selections from Townshend's  catalogue.

Cast
The cast included:

Pete Townshend	 ...	Himself
John Labanowski	 ...	Ray High
Linal Haft	 ...	Rastus Knight
Jan Ravens	 ...	Ruth Streeting
Sage Carter	 ...	Athena
John Bundrick	 ...	Keyboards
Peter Hope Evans	 ...	Harmonica
Andy Fairweather Low	 ...	Guitar
Deirdre Harrison	 ...	Athena (voice)
Katie Kissoon	 ...	Vocalist
Billy Nicholls	 ...	Vocalist
Pino Palladino	 ...	Bass
Phil Palmer	 ...	Guitar
Simon Phillips	 ...	Drums
Lee Whitlock	 ...	Spinner (voice)

Track listing
Disc 1
"Intro" 
"English Boy"	 
"Meher Baba M3"	 
"Let's Get Pretentious"	 
"Meher Baba M4"	 
"Early Morning Dreams"	 
"I Want That Thing"	 
"Intro: Outlive The Dinosaur"	 
"Outlive The Dinosaur"	 
"Gridlife 1"	 
"Flame" (demo)	 
"Now and Then"	 
"I am Afraid"	 
"Gridlife 2"	 
"Don't Try to Make Me Real"	 
"Intro: Predictable"	 
"Predictable"	 
"Flame"	 
"Meher Baba M5" (Vivaldi)	 
"Fake It"	 
"Intro: Now and Then" (reprise)	 
"Now and Then" (reprise)	 
"Baba O'Riley" (demo)	 
"English Boy" (reprise)

Disc 2

"Pinball Wizard" 
"See Me Feel Me/Listening to You" 
"Let My Love Open The Door"
"Rough Boys"
"Behind Blue Eyes" 
"The Kids Are Alright"
"Keep Me Turning"
"Eminence Front"
"A Little Is Enough"
"You Better You Bet" 
"Face The Face"
"Won't Get Fooled Again" 
"Let’s See Action (Nothing Is Everything)"
"Magic Bus"

References

2003 live albums
Pete Townshend live albums
Rock operas
Rock musicals
Albums produced by Pete Townshend